This page indexes the individual year in Danish music pages. Each year is annotated with a significant event as a reference point.


2010s - Pre-2010s

2010s
 2019 in Danish music
 2018 in Danish music
 2017 in Danish music, deaths of Nicolai Munch-Hansen, and Svend Asmussen.
 2016 in Danish music, deaths of Else Marie Pade, Karina Jensen, Ove Verner Hansen, and Pelle Gudmundsen-Holmgreen.
 2015 in Danish music, death of Jørgen Ingmann.
 2014 in Danish music
 2013 in Danish music
 2012 in Danish music
 2011 in Danish music
 2010 in Danish music

Pre-2010s
 2009 in Danish music

 Denmark
Denmark years
Danish music-related lists